The 2016–17 season was Sport Lisboa e Benfica's 113th season in existence and the club's 83rd consecutive season in the top flight of Portuguese football. It started on 7 August 2016 with the Supertaça Cândido de Oliveira match and concluded on 28 May 2017 with the Taça de Portugal final.

Benfica played in the Primeira Liga as three-time defending champions, and were successful in defending their title, becoming a four-time champions (tetra) for the first time in their history; setting a new record of 36 league titles. In the Taça da Liga, Benfica, who also participated as the three-time defending holders, lost to eventual winners Moreirense in the semi-finals. It was Benfica's first defeat in the competition since 31 October 2007, which ended a 42-game unbeaten run. In the Taça de Portugal, Benfica beat Vitória de Guimarães to win their 26th trophy – a new record. With this victory, Benfica also achieved their 11th double (dobradinha) and second treble of league, cup and super cup, 36 years after the first one.

Internationally, Benfica played in the UEFA Champions League, where they reached the knockout phase for the first time in two consecutive years. They were eliminated from the competition in round of 16 by Borussia Dortmund on 4–1 aggregate.

Players

Squad information

New contracts

Transfers

In

Out

Technical staff

(B) – Benfica B player

Includes Supertaça Cândido de Oliveira

Goalscorers

Includes Supertaça Cândido de Oliveira

Hat-tricks

(H) – Home ; (A) – Away

Clean sheets
Number of appearances inside brackets.

Disciplinary record

Awards

Player

Manager

References

S.L. Benfica seasons
Benfica
Benfica
Portuguese football championship-winning seasons